Jan "Ptaszyn" Wróblewski (born 27 March 1936) is a Polish jazz musician, composer and arranger. He plays the tenor and baritone saxophones.

Wróblewski began his musical career in 1956 at the first Sopot Jazz Festival in Krzysztof Komeda's group. In 1958, he became the first Polish jazz musician to perform at the Newport Jazz Festival as a member of the International Youth Band. He toured around the world and for a decade, beginning in 1958, he directed the Polish Radio Jazz Studio. He has been associated with Third Stream.

He is also the DJ of Europe's longest running Jazz Program, broadcast weekly by the Polskie Radio Program III since 1970.

Discography 
 1956 Sextet Komedy: Festiwal Jazzowy Sopot
 1958 All Stars Swingtet
 1958 Jazz Believers
 1958 Newport International Youth Band
 1960 Quintet Ptaszyna Wróblewskiego
 1960 Jazz Jamboree ’60
 1961 Jazz Outsiders
 1961 Kwintet Jerzego Miliana + Jan Ptaszyn Wróblewski
 1961 Jazz Jamboree ’61
 1962 Ballet Etudes: The Music of Komeda
 1963 Kwintet Andrzeja Kurylewicza
 1964 Polish Jazz Quartet
 1965 Ptaszyn Wróblewski Quartet
 1965 Jazz Jamboree ’65
 1969 Studio Jazzowe Polskiego Radia
 1974 Sprzedawcy glonów
 1975 SPPT Chałturnik i Andrzej Rosiewicz
 1976 Skleroptak
 1977 Mainstream
 1977 Kisa Magnusson & Mainstream
 1978 Jam Session w Akwarium 1
 1978 Flyin' Lady
 1980 Z lotu Ptaka
 1983 New Presentation
 1989 Jan Ptaszyn Wróblewski: Polish Jazz
 1993 Czwartet-Live In Hades
 1995 Made in Poland
 1998 Henryk Wars Songs
 2005 Real Jazz
 2007 Supercalifragilistic
 2014 Moi pierwsi mistrzowie – Komeda/Trzaskowski/Kurylewicz (Boogie Production)

References

External links

Jan Ptaszyn Wroblewski biography at the Polish Institute of Culture in New York City
Jan Wróblewski on Facebook

1936 births
Living people
Polish jazz composers
Jazz tenor saxophonists
Third stream musicians
Male jazz composers
Polish saxophonists
20th-century Polish musicians
20th-century saxophonists
21st-century Polish musicians
21st-century saxophonists
20th-century male musicians
21st-century male musicians